Annette Paul (1863–1952) was a New Zealand salvation army officer. She was born in Auckland, New Zealand in 1863. She was buried at Hillsborough Cemetery.

References

1863 births
1952 deaths
People from Auckland
New Zealand Salvationists
Burials at Hillsborough Cemetery, Auckland